Euler's flycatcher (Lathrotriccus euleri) is a small passerine bird in the tyrant flycatcher family. It breeds in South America east of the Andes from Colombia and Venezuela south to Bolivia and Argentina, and on the islands of Trinidad and formerly also Grenada (see below). This species is named for the Swiss ornithologist Carl Euler.

In appearance, it closely resembles the Empidonax flycatchers, and was formerly placed in that genus, but differs in anatomical and molecular characters. The upperparts are olive-brown with darker brown wings and two dull buff wing bars. The throat breast is grey, the breast is brown, and the abdomen is pale yellow. There is a white eyering, but no supercilium. Sexes are similar. There are other races, differing in the tone of the upperpart or underpart colour. The call is a loud hoarse chee-chi-wi-wi-wi.

This species is found in the lower and middle levels of forests. Euler's flycatchers are inconspicuous birds, tending to keep to undergrowth perches from which they sally forth to catch insects; they are also capable of hovering flight to pick off prey from plants, but use it far less often.

In subtropical montane forest in the south of its range, it breeds in the rainy summer months, with peak nesting activity in late October to November and extending to January–February. The open cup nest is made of grass, leaves and plant fibre and placed in a tree fork. It is usually located a few meters above ground, but may be right up in the tree's crown.

Only the female incubates, and she will every now and then leave the nest for various reasons. When on the nest, the male provisions her with food. At about  ambient temperature, the young hatch after 16–18 days, and fledge after about 15 days. They are being fed by both parents, and older nestlings have a voracious appetite. As they near fledging, one can find a parent arriving with new food every few minutes. Brood loss due to predation was found to be moderate to light in the Southern Andean Yungas.

It is often fairly common, and on a global scale it is not considered threatened. However, the Grenadan Euler's flycatcher (L. e. flaviventris) has not been recorded since the early 1950s, and is likely extinct. The reasons for this are insufficiently known, but probably related to habitat destruction and possibly introduced predators. A junior synonym of flaviventris is johnstoni, but the latter was used when Euler's flycatcher was placed in the genus Empidonax, as flaviventris is preoccupied in that genus by the yellow-bellied flycatcher (E. flaviventris).

References

Further reading
 ffrench, Richard; O'Neill, John Patton & Eckelberry, Don R. (1991): A guide to the birds of Trinidad and Tobago (2nd edition). Comstock Publishing, Ithaca, N.Y. 
 Hilty, Steven L. (2003): Birds of Venezuela. Christopher Helm, London. 

Euler's flycatcher
Birds of the Amazon Basin
Birds of Brazil
Birds of Colombia
Birds of Venezuela
Birds of Trinidad and Tobago
Birds of Bolivia
Birds of Paraguay
Birds of Uruguay
Euler's flycatcher